Joanna Douglas (born April 11, 1983) is a Canadian actress.   She is best known for portraying Samantha Strange on Being Erica.   She is a graduate of the University of Toronto and Sheridan College's joint theatre and drama studies program.

Life and career

Douglas was born in Sault Ste. Marie, Ontario. As an adolescent, Douglas had a difficult time in high school.  Her mother allowed her to change school districts to get a fresh start.  Her participation in dancing helped her to eventually make more friends.  It was through dancing that she developed an interest in the arts.  She then became involved with the drama program at her high school, which she enjoyed.  However, her mother was not initially supportive of her decision to pursue acting.

Douglas described her role on Being Erica as a "wonderful opportunity".  She also praised the writing on the show.

About her role in Saw 3D, she stated that even though she was in the movie, she has not seen any of the films in the franchise because they "terrify" her.

Filmography

References

External links 

1983 births
Living people
Actresses from Ontario
Canadian television actresses
Canadian film actresses
People from Sault Ste. Marie, Ontario